Virgil Peter Franchetti (6 March 1954) is a Scottish retired amateur football forward who played in the Scottish League for Queen's Park and Clyde. He was capped by Scotland at amateur level.

Personal life 
Franchetti's brother Ray also became a footballer.

References

Scottish footballers
Scottish Football League players
Queen's Park F.C. players
Association football forwards
Scotland amateur international footballers
Living people
Clyde F.C. players
1954 births
Footballers from Glasgow
People educated at St Mungo's Academy
Scottish people of Italian descent